Woodstock: Music from the Original Soundtrack and More is a live album of selected performances from the 1969 Woodstock counterculture festival officially known as "The Woodstock Music & Art Fair". The album was compiled & produced by Eric Blackstead. Originally released on Atlantic Records' Cotillion label as a triple album on May 11, 1970, it was re-released as a 4 CD box (along with Woodstock Two) by Mobile Fidelity Sound Labs in 1986 followed by a two-CD set released by Atlantic in 1987. Atlantic re-issued the two-CD set in 1994 correcting a few mastering errors found on their 1987 release. Veteran producer Eddie Kramer along with Lee Osbourne were the sound engineers during the three-day event.

Although largely authentic, a number of tracks feature truncated performances or overdubs recorded after the festival, and two tracks not recorded at the festival at all. Some of the audio material on the album was recorded by the sound crew of the Wadeligh-Maurice film crew.  It was packaged in a triple-gatefold sleeve featuring a 3-panel photo of the crowd taken from the stage by photographer Jim Marshall.

A second collection of recordings from the festival, Woodstock Two, was released a year later. In 1994, the songs from both albums, as well as numerous additional, previously unreleased performances from the festival (but not the stage announcements and crowd noises) were reissued by Atlantic as a four-CD box set titled Woodstock: Three Days of Peace and Music. In 2009, Rhino Records issued a six-CD box set, Woodstock: 40 Years On: Back to Yasgur's Farm, which includes further musical performances as well as stage announcements and other ancillary material. Rhino Records also reissued a remastered version of the original double CD album in 2009. Target issued a version exclusive to their stores that included a bonus disc of 14 tracks, including one previously unreleased track, "Misty Roses" by Tim Hardin.

It was certified Gold on May 22, 1970, and 2× Platinum in 1993.

Cover
The couple on the album cover were photographed by Burk Uzzle for the Magnum agency. In 1989, Life Magazine identified them as a then 20-year-old couple named Bobbi Kelly and Nick Ercoline, who married two years later and raised a family in Pine Bush, New York, just  from the festival site. That claim has since been disputed by a woman named Jessie Kerr from Vancouver Island, and her friend John.

Track listing
On the LP release, side one was backed with side six, side two was backed with side five, and side three was backed with side four. This was common on multi-LP sets of the time, to accommodate the popular record changer turntables.

Most of the tracks have some form of stage announcement, conversation by the musicians, etc., lengthening the tracks to an extent. Times are listed as the length of time the music was played in the song, while times in parentheses indicate the total running time of the entire track.

Side one
 John Sebastian – "I Had a Dream" (Sebastian) – 2:38 (2:53)
 Canned Heat – "Going Up the Country" (Alan Wilson) – 3:19 (5:53)
 Stage announcements
 Richie Havens – "Freedom (Motherless Child)" (traditional, arranged by Havens) – 5:13 (5:26)
 Country Joe and the Fish – "Rock and Soul Music" (Country Joe McDonald, Barry "The Fish" Melton, David Cohen, Bruce Barthol, Gary "Chicken" Hirsh) – 2:09 (2:09)
 Arlo Guthrie – "Coming into Los Angeles" (Guthrie) – 2:05 (2:50)  
 Sha-Na-Na – "At the Hop" (Artie Singer, David White, John Medora) – 2:13 (2:33)

Side two
 Country Joe McDonald – "The Fish Cheer" / "I-Feel-Like-I'm-Fixin'-to-Die Rag" (McDonald) – 3:02 (3:48)
 Joan Baez featuring Jeffrey Shurtleff –  "Drug Store Truck Drivin' Man" (Roger McGuinn, Gram Parsons) – 2:08 (2:38)
 Joan Baez – "Joe Hill" (Alfred Hayes, Earl Robinson) – 2:40 (5:34)
 Stage announcements
 Crosby, Stills & Nash – "Suite: Judy Blue Eyes" (Stephen Stills) – 8:04 (9:02)
 Crosby, Stills, Nash & Young – "Sea of Madness" (Neil Young) – 3:22 (4:20) 

Side three
 Crosby, Stills, Nash & Young – "Wooden Ships" (Stills, David Crosby, Paul Kantner) – 5:26 (5:26)
 The Who – "We're Not Gonna Take It" (Pete Townshend) – 4:39 (6:54) 
 Stage announcements
 Joe Cocker –  "With a Little Help from My Friends" (John Lennon, Paul McCartney) – 7:50 (10:06) 

Side four
 Crowd rain chant
 Santana – "Soul Sacrifice" (Carlos Santana, Greg Rolie, David Brown, Michael Carabello, Michael Shrieve, Jose Areas) – 8:05 (13:52) 
 Stage announcements
 Ten Years After – "I'm Going Home" (Alvin Lee) – 9:20 (9:57)

Side five
 Jefferson Airplane – "Volunteers" (Marty Balin, Kantner) – 2:45 (3:31) 
 Max Yasgur
 Sly and the Family Stone – Medley: "Dance to the Music" / "Music Lover" / "I Want to Take You Higher" (Sly Stone) – 13:47 (15:29)
 John Sebastian – "Rainbows All Over Your Blues" (Sebastian) – 2:05 (3:54)

Side six
 Butterfield Blues Band – "Love March" (Gene Dinwiddie, Phillip Wilson) – 8:43 (8:59)
 Jimi Hendrix – "The Star-Spangled Banner" / "Purple Haze" / "Instrumental Solo" (Hendrix, except "The Star-Spangled Banner" written by Francis Scott Key and John Stafford Smith and arranged by Hendrix) – 12:51 (13:42) 

Notes

Charts

References

External links
 

1970 live albums
1970 soundtrack albums
Atlantic Records live albums
Atlantic Records soundtracks
Cotillion Records live albums
Cotillion Records soundtracks
Film soundtracks
Woodstock Festival